David Rowan (born David Drohan, December 6, 1882 – July 30, 1955) was a Major League Baseball first baseman who played for the St. Louis Browns in 1911. A native of Elora, Ontario, Canada, the 28-year-old rookie stood 5'11" and weighed 175 lbs.

Rowan spent about a month with St. Louis, playing in his first game May 27 and his last on June 22. He appeared in 18 games and hit .385 (25-for-65) with 11 runs batted in and 7 runs scored. He drew 4 walks which pushed his on-base percentage up to .420. At first base he handled 172 out of 182 total chances successfully for a fielding percentage of .945, which was well below the league average at the time.

Rowan's minor league career spanned ten seasons, from  until .

Rowan died at the age of 72 in Toronto, Ontario, Canada.

External links

1882 births
1955 deaths
Aberdeen Harbor Grays players
Baseball people from Ontario
Canadian expatriate baseball players in the United States
Major League Baseball first basemen
Major League Baseball players from Canada
St. Louis Browns players
People from Centre Wellington
Minor league baseball managers
Everett Smokestackers players
Spokane Indians players
St. Paul Saints (AA) players
Grays Harbor Grays players
Seattle Siwashes players
Peoria Distillers players
Toronto Maple Leafs (International League) players
Mobile Sea Gulls players
Dubuque Dubs players
Springfield Watchmakers players